Jeremy Vine on 5 is a British television chat and topical debate show which airs on Channel 5 on weekdays mornings from 9:15am to 12:45pm, hosted by Jeremy Vine and Storm Huntley. The show replaced its long-running predecessor The Wright Stuff, hosted by Matthew Wright for 18 years, who announced he would be leaving just before the summer of 2018. The show has the same format, concept, theme music and filming studio. This show first aired on 3 September 2018 and features celebrity panelists who debate the latest news, views and the headlines.

Studio and production
The show is currently broadcast by its former long-running prodcesser The Wright Stuff studio.
The show is currently being filmed and produced by Channel 5 and ITN Productions.

The majority of the show airs live, however due to Vine's BBC Radio 2 weekday lunchtime show which begins at 12pm, the final 45 minutes of the main show is pre-recorded, at around 8:00am, to allow Vine to travel to Wogan House for his radio show.

Hosts

Main host and stand-ins

Co-presenters
A main feature returning from the former program The Wright Stuff is that there is a male or female co-host who sits in the audience area. This role is currently performed by Storm Huntley, who previously  worked on The Wright Stuff and was carried over to Jeremy Vine. From 2020, the co-host returned to the booth due to the COVID-19 pandemic, before moving next to the panellists in May 2022.

Regular panellists
 Nicola McLean (2018–)
 Carole Malone (2018–)
 Anne Diamond (2018–2021)
 Dawn Neesom (2018–)
 Lowri Turner (2018–)
 Nina Myskow (2018–)
 Cristo Foufas (2021–)
 Yasmin Alibhai-Brown (2018–)
 Mike Parry (2018–)
 Marina Purkiss (2022-)

Jeremy Vine Extra
On 17 January 2022, it was announced that Vine's morning show slot would be extended by an hour from 19 January 2022 by dropping the scheduled repeat of Shoplifters & Scammers: At War with the Law at 12:15pm and moving Nightmare Tenants, Slum Landlords by an hour. The extended part of the programme will be known as Jeremy Vine Extra with the hour hosted by Huntley, as Vine has a radio show on BBC Radio 2 that starts at 12:00pm (though for the schedules from 19 January until late February, Tina Daheley was sitting in for Vine on the radio). The first cover presenter, Tessa Chapman, hosted the show on 23 March. Dawn Neesom hosted from  27 June to 1 July due to Huntley having COVID-19.

It was announced on 6 July 2022 that during Huntley’s maternity leave, that Neesom would take over in July and early August and Alexis Conran and Michelle Ackerley will take over from the second Monday of August and the first Monday of September respectively. It was also announced that the show will be extended to end at 12:45pm from 1 August 2022 onwards due to the ending of Australian soap opera Neighbours. Following Conran’s final show on 2nd September 2022, Neesom returned to present the first week of Ackerley’s duration before Ackerley joined the following week. After Ackerley's final show, Conran returned for the following week, followed by Neesom for the week after.

References

External links
 
 

Channel 5 (British TV channel) original programming
2018 British television series debuts
2010s British television talk shows
2020s British television talk shows
Television series by ITV Studios
English-language television shows